Brucebo is an artists' estate in Själsö, Väskinde on Gotland, Sweden, created by William Blair Bruce and his wife Carolina Benedicks-Bruce. The estate later became a nature reserve and an art museum managed by the Brucebo Foundation. The Bruce and Benedicks legacy also includes the Brucebo Fine Art Scholarship for young Canadian artists.

The estate 

Brucebo was originally a summer house bought by William Blair Bruce and his wife Carolina Benedicks-Bruce. In 1900–06, the couple added a large extension to the small main house on the estate. The house was built in the neo-romantic style of the early 1900s. The new part of the house included a studio with large windows facing the sea. The idea behind the design of the house was to eliminate the line between the outdoors and the indoors. The couple created many artistic works at Brucebo and many of them can still be seen there, since the house has been converted into an art museum. The house and the museum are maintained and owned by the Brucebo Foundation.

In addition to the main house there are several buildings, most of which were constructed during 1900–06, when the extension to the main house was built. There is a pavilion, a forest studio, a beach studio, the Caretaker's House, a stable with an additional shed and an ice cellar made of limestone. The buildings are designed in the same style as the main house, except for the Caretaker's House, which is inspired by one of the houses at Standgatan in Visby, the Burmeister 4.

History 
In her will, Benedicks-Bruce, left Brucebo to a scholarship fund that would enable young Canadian and Swedish artists to come and stay at Brucebo. However, this program did not start until after a major renovation of the house a few years after her death. The estate served as a boardinghouse for artists for a while up until 1970, when it was designated a nature reserve. The Gotland Municipality owned Brucebo between 1971 and 1973. 

In 1973, Brucebo was sold to Swedish TV-producer and director Torbjörn Axelman (born 1932) who started to renovate the main house and the estate. When Axelman's company went bankrupt in 1995, the Brucebo Foundation bought back the estate and Axelman stayed on as a tenant in the old part of the main house. With the foundation as owner, renovations were done at the house and plans to convert it to a museum were set in motion.

Museum 

In 2009, work began to convert the main house in Brucebo into a museum. The project was managed by the Brucebo Foundation. The house was cleaned, the original furniture was renovated and the art, comprising thousands of works, was brought to the Gotland Museum to be catalogued and restored. Everything was later brought back to the house and the ground floor was arranged in exactly the same way it had been when Bruce and Benedicks-Bruce lived there. The museum opened in 2012, and is open for pre-booked groups of visitors.

Nature reserve 
In 1970, the Brucebo estate was established as a nature reserve. The Brucebo nature reserve is mainly located in Visby, a minor part of it belongs to Väskinde socken. It is described as a "miniature Gotland" since all the different kinds of landscapes on the island are represented there. In 2005, it was designated as a Natura 2000 area.

The reserve is directly south of the museum and includes the Skansudd bird reserve and the cliff to its east, with a  hill fort on the crest.

The crest of the cliff, where the limestone is bare, is a habitat for Cerastium pumilum, Cerastium semidecandrum, Potentilla neumanniana, Veronica spicata, Scabiosa columbaria and Pilosella peleteriana. Nearby, can be found stands of Artemisia rupestris, Sorbus rupicola, Cotoneaster niger, elderberry, Rosa mollis and sweet briar. There are grape vines and mahaleb cherrys, probably from seeds carried by birds, growing on a barrow near the hill fort. The area below the cliff is forested with firs and deciduous trees entwined with ivy. A number of rare and endangered species of fungi have also been registered in the reserve.

In the drop of the cliff is a small cave called the Brucebo Cave, where relics from an Iron Age settlement have been found.

Brucebo Foundation 
In 1972, the estate of Carolina Benedicks-Bruce created the Brucebo Fine Art Scholarship Foundation. The scholarship is given to younger Canadian artists, to come and stay, work and study at Brucebo on Gotland.

Scholarship recipients 
Summer Residency and Travel Scholarship.

1972, Karen Madson Pascal
1973, Daphne Odjig-Bevon
1974, Tin Yum Lau
1975, John Lander
1976, Lupe Rodrigues
1977, Carole Rubin
1978, Michelle Desjardins
1979, —
1980, Roger Savage
1981, Thomas Corriveau
1982, Reginald Yates
1983, —
1984, David Abelson
1985, —
1986, Dawna Gallagher
1987, Terry Emrich
1988, Peter Raymond
1989 Jane Reagh
1999, G. Scott MacLeod 
2000, —
2001, Eva Richardson, Laurel Smith
2002, Andrew Rucklidge, Yechel Gagnon 
2003, Keer Tanchak 
2004, Allison Katz, Alex Bartosik 
2005, Alexandre Masino, Andrea Vander Kooij 
2006, Natasha Mazurka, Geneviève Chevalier 
2007, Francois Saint-Pierre, Allison Freeman 
2008, Mark Prier, Josée Pedneault 
2009, Amy Schissel, Elisabeth Belliveau
2010, Kristen Bjornerud, Andrew Morrow 
2011, Daniel Hutchinson, Jessica Auer 
2012, Véronique La Perrière, Rilla Marshall 
2013, Sara A. Tremblay, Michael Dudeck 
2014, Daniel Paterson, Jim Holyoak 
2015, Jeremy Herndl, Liz Toohey-Weise
2016, Corri-Lynn Tetz. John Player
2017, Laura Findlay, Caroline Boileau

Brucebo shooting 
In 2008, the Brucebo Foundation's work with converting Brucebo into a museum started. The whole house was to be renovated and the previous owner, now tenant, Torbjörn Axelman was dismissed from his apartment in the main house in October that year. Axelman refused to accept this and held the chairman of the foundation, Joakim Hansson personally responsible for the decision. 

On 1December 2008, Hansson, his assistants and helpers arrived with a moving truck at Brucebo to collect the old furniture and the art and transport them to the Gotland Museum for restoration and cataloguing. Axelman resented this and at approximately 2:00pm he pulled out a gun and shot Hansson three times, twice in the back and once in one of his hands. Hansson and two other persons managed to flee from the house out into the garden and three other persons, who were in the house, hid out on a balcony on the top floor.

When the local police came to Brucebo, they could not get Axelman to come out of the house. A team from the National Task Force were flown in from Stockholm. The police surrounded the house and at about 9:00pm, they managed to bring Hansson and the rest of the personnel outside the house and on the balcony, to safety. Hansson was brought to hospital where his condition was declared as not critical. Shortly after 10:00pm, Axelman came out of the house with a gun in his hand and started to shoot at the policemen, who returned fire and shot Axelman once in each thigh and once in the chest. Axelman was arrested and taken to hospital. He had lost a lot of blood and was treated for severe injuries.

On 5February 2009, Axelman was found guilty by the Gotland district court, of three charges of attempted murder. According to the Swedish National Board of Forensic Medicine, Axelman suffered from a severe mental disorder and in need of psychiatric treatment. The district court's sentence was established by the Svea Court of Appeal on 10 June 2010. He was sentenced to psychiatric care at a closed institution. In October 2011, Axelman was moved from closed to open care, with a restriction that he was forbidden to visit Gotland. In March 2012, he was released from care and the restriction was lifted.

See also 
Carl Larsson's Sundborn
Anders Zorn's Zorngården

References

Further reading

External links 

Maps, pictures and a presentation of Brucebo (in Swedish)

Nature reserves in Sweden
Tourist attractions in Gotland County
Geography of Gotland County
1900 establishments in Sweden
Cultural heritage of Sweden
Art museums and galleries in Sweden
2008 crimes in Sweden